A by-election was held in the Dáil Éireann Dublin South constituency in Ireland on Friday, 5 June 2009, following the death of the Fianna Fáil Teachta Dála (TD) Séamus Brennan on 9 July 2008. As Brennan was a Fianna Fáil TD, that party had the responsibility of deciding when the by-election should take place. It was held on the same day as the 2009 European and local elections. There was no legal requirement on when to hold a by-election in Ireland in 2009 but it was generally held within six months. A by-election in the Dublin Central constituency was held on the same date.

Eight candidates contested the vacant seat, with victory going to the Fine Gael candidate, George Lee who was elected on the first count.

Result

George Lee resigned from Dáil Éireann on 8 February 2010 after serving 8 months as a TD.

See also
2009 Dublin Central by-election
List of Dáil by-elections
Dáil constituencies

References

2009 Dublin South by-election
2009 in Irish politics
30th Dáil
By-elections in the Republic of Ireland
Elections in Dún Laoghaire–Rathdown
Elections in South Dublin (county)
By-elections in County Dublin
June 2009 events in Europe